Samantha Johnson (born 1991) is an American soccer player.

Samantha or Sammie Johnson may also refer to:
Samantha Johnson (beauty pageant) (born 1984), American beauty queen
Samantha Johnson (singer), American singer, contestant in America's Got Talent in 2015
Sammie Johnson (born 1992), Australian rules footballer

See also
Samuel Johnson (disambiguation)